Louis Edmond Durey (27 May 18883 July 1979) was a French composer.

Life
Louis Durey was born in Paris, the son of a local businessman. It was not until he was nineteen years old that he chose to pursue a musical career after hearing a performance of a Claude Debussy work. As a composer he was primarily self-taught. From the beginning, choral music was of great importance in Durey's productivity.  His L'Offrande Lyrique (1914) has been called the first piece of French twelve-tone music. The first of his works to gain recognition in the music world was for a piano duet titled Carillons.  At a 1918 concert this work attracted the interest of Maurice Ravel, who recommended him to his publisher.

Durey communicated with his colleague, Darius Milhaud, and asked him to contribute a piano piece that would bring together the six composers who, in 1920 were dubbed Les Six. This joint project was L'Album des Six. Despite the acclaim they received, Durey did not participate in the group's 1921 collaborative work Les mariés de la tour Eiffel, a decision which was a source of great irritation to Jean Cocteau.

After the Les Six period, Durey continued with his career. Never feeling the need to belong to the musical establishment, he voiced his growing left-wing ideals that put him in an artistic isolation that lasted for the rest of his life.

Following the break with Cocteau, Durey withdrew to his home in Saint-Tropez in the south of France. In addition to chamber music, at Saint-Tropez he wrote his only opera, L'Occasion. In 1929, he married Anne Grangeon and moved back to Paris the following year. In the mid-thirties he joined the Communist Party and became active in the newly formed Fédération Musicale Populaire. During the years of the Nazi occupation of World War II, he worked with the French Resistance as a prominent member of the Front National des Musiciens who worked to hide Jews and preserve French music under Nazi rule. He also wrote anti-fascist songs. As others, he stopped composing under Nazi rule and instead arranged and collected older French music and folk songs.

After the war he embraced hard-line communism and his uncompromising political attitudes hindered his career. Needing to earn a living, in 1950 he accepted the post of music critic for a communist newspaper in Paris.

In the late 1950s and early 1960s he continued to compose but these works did not reach widespread popularity. His work on Vietnamese themes in the 1960s, based on his disgust with the turmoil France had left in Vietnam (formerly French Indochina) and the ensuing Vietnam War, seemed at that time in Paris to be a voice in the wilderness. He set poems by Ho Chi Minh and Mao Zedong. Other works include a string quartet, a flute sonatina, and Images à Crusoe.

Louis Durey died at Saint-Tropez in 1979.

Piano works

Notes

References 
 Kennedy, Michael, The Oxford Dictionary of Music (2006), 
 Frédéric Robert, Louis Durey: L'aîne des Six (Les Éditeurs Français Réunis, 1968)

External links

 

1888 births
1979 deaths
20th-century classical composers
Communist members of the French Resistance
French classical composers
French communists
French male classical composers
Les Six
Musicians from Paris
Neoclassical composers
20th-century French male musicians